The 1979–80 Roller Hockey Champions Cup was the 15th edition of the Roller Hockey Champions Cup organized by CERH.

Barcelona achieved their fifth title.

Teams
The champions of the main European leagues, and Barcelona as title holders, played this competition, consisting in a double-legged knockout tournament. As Barcelona qualified also as Spanish champion, Reus Deportiu joined also the competition.

Bracket

Source:

References

External links
 CERH website

1979 in roller hockey
1980 in roller hockey
Rink Hockey Euroleague